Corporate Dispatch is an English language newspaper published in Malta. Its first edition was published on 24 March 2018.

History 
Corporate Dispatch was first published on 24 March 2018. It describes itself as apolitical.

References 

Publications established in 2018
Newspapers published in Malta
English-language newspapers published in Europe